Language-oriented programming (LOP) is a software-development paradigm where "language" is a software building block with the same status as objects, modules and components, and rather than solving problems in general-purpose programming languages, the programmer creates one or more domain-specific languages (DSLs) for the problem first, and solves the problem in those languages. Language-oriented programming was first described in detail in Martin Ward's 1994 paper Language Oriented Programming, published in Software - Concepts and Tools, Vol.15, No.4, pp 147–161, 1994.

Concept
The concept of language-oriented programming takes the approach to capture requirements in the user's terms, and then to try to create an implementation language as isomorphic as possible to the user's descriptions, so that the mapping between requirements and implementation is as direct as possible. A measure of the closeness of this isomorphism is the "redundancy" of the language, defined as the number of editing operations needed to implement a stand-alone change in requirements. It is not assumed a-priori what is the best language for implementing the new language. Rather, the developer can choose among options created by analysis of the information flows — what information is acquired, what its structure is, when it is acquired, from whom, and what is done with it.

Development
The Racket programming language is designed to support language-oriented programming. Other language workbench tools such as JetBrains MPS, Kermeta, or Xtext provide the tools to design and implement DSLs and language-oriented programming.

See also
 Grammar-oriented programming
 Dialecting
 Domain-specific language
 Extensible programming
 Intentional programming
 Homoiconicity

References

External links
 Language Oriented Programming: The Next Programming Paradigm Sergey Dmitriev's paper that further explored the topic.
Language Oriented Programming in MetaLisp  Gyuri Lajos's thesis 1992 University of Leeds The system used the very same Top Down Parsing Language algorithm that powered Tree-Meta

Programming paradigms